Zirkan (also Romanized as Zīrkan; also known as Zīrkand) is a village in Tabadkan Rural District, in the Central District of Mashhad County, Razavi Khorasan Province, Iran. At the 2006 census, its population was 530, in 136 families.

References 

Populated places in Mashhad County